The Devastations of Osorio (in Spanish, las Devastaciones de Osorio) refer to a period in the colonial history of the Caribbean island of Hispaniola in the early 17th century. The Devastations were carried out between 1605 and 1606.

History
In 1604, the King of Spain, Philip III, observing the growing lack of Crown control in the north and western parts of Hispaniola, granted Governor Antonio de Osorio and Archbishop Agustín Dávila y Padilla the power to take whatever action they deemed prudent in order to stop the incursion of foreign contraband as well as contact between Catholic subjects of the Crown and heretics. The origin of the problem was that the residents of Puerto Plata, Montecristi, Bayajá and Yaguana traded their products (especially cured meat and hides) with the French, the English and the Dutch, and received contraband goods in return. This traffic had been carrying on from the middle of the 16th century and kept growing year by year. The king's order forced the officials to carry out the depopulation of the regions in which smuggling was rampant, so that the Crown’s subjects could be moved to a location closer to the capital of the island, Santo Domingo. When the people of the northwest first heard about this order, the town councils began to raise petitions in which they requested the abolition of the measure. However, Governor Osorio, who upon the death of the archbishop Dávila y Padilla had to face the situation alone, decided to comply with the letter of the royal ordinance. In mid-February 1605, royal representatives left for the northern part of Hispaniola to proclaim that the people of the area would be forgiven crimes committed against the Spanish Crown resulting from the practice of trafficking with foreigners and heretics, but only under one condition: that they would collect all their personal belongings, slaves, cattle and other property, and move to the southeast, to locations pre-determined by the royal authorities of Santo Domingo. (Some officials of the Spanish audiencia tried to suppress the royal order, since their own smuggling interests would also be affected.) 

The population of the north resisted and Osorio had to ask for reinforcements to comply with the royal order. The help came from the governor of Puerto Rico, Sancho Ochoa de Castro, who in September of that same year 1605 sent an infantry company to Santo Domingo to help out the forces of Hispaniola. The contingent, composed of 159 soldiers under the command of Captain Francisco Ferrecuelo, went to the north of the island, where the orders of Osorio were forcibly imposed, and the residents of the region obliged to abandon their farms and homesteads. In order to achieve their objective, the soldiers destroyed sugar plantations, burned huts, ranches, haciendas and churches, and dismantled everything that the villagers needed to live in those places. The main depopulated areas were Puerto Plata, Montecristi, Bayajá and Yaguana. At the end of January 1606, Antonio de Osorio wrote to the king, communicating that the devastation had ended and that he only needed to go through the herds of cattle of the north, and those of Santiago, San Juan and Azua. The process was however delayed until the middle of the year. Eventually, the governor established a border that stretched from Azua in the south all the way to the north coast, and prohibited the Hispanic inhabitants from crossing it. The inhabitants of Bayajá and Yaguana were concentrated in a new town that received the name of Bayaguana, and the inhabitants of Montecristi and Puerto Plata were relocated to Monte Plata. 

In any event, the governor's operation failed to stop smuggling in the region. The destruction of about 120 herds of cattle, which totaled more than 100,000 cattle, cows, pigs and horses, proved to be disastrous, since only 15% of the cattle could be moved to new locations, while the rest were abandoned. Within a short time, these herds turned wild. Moreover, the destruction of the mills and trapiches accelerated the decline of the sugar industry which, added to the loss of livestock and plantations of cane and ginger, increased poverty on the island and removed Santo Domingo to the margins of colonial trade. The depopulation of the northwestern part of Hispaniola was taken advantage of by black slaves who, fleeing from their masters, settled in that region. Runaway slaves came not only from the island itself, but also from neighboring Cuba and Puerto Rico. Likewise, the evacuation of half of Hispaniola did not cause this territory to be forgotten, as the Crown had wished, but rather it fell upon the mercy of foreigners who benefitted greatly from the cattle and other fruits of the land left behind by the Spaniards. Finally, the misery that was generated after the Osorio Devastations also affected the tax revenues of the colony, to the point that these were no longer enough to cover bureaucratic expenses nor the maintenance of the armed forces in Santo Domingo.

Similarity to Florida expedition
It is interesting to note that a similar situation occurred in Florida. In the middle of 1601, King Philip III, observing the difficulties in maintaining the sparse population of Spanish settlers in the face of continued attacks by the native Indians (and also noticing the limited amount of agricultural and livestock production), ordered the governor of Havana, Juan Maldonado Barnuevo, to send an expedition northwards. The expedition, composed of soldiers and friars under the command of Captain Don Fernando de Valdés, was to perform an inspection and determine the cost to the Crown of maintaining the province. Although the expedition found places in Florida that could have been better utilized for colonial establishments, the Captain warned that the abandonment of San Agustín could harm Spain to the benefit of her enemies. Finally, the combined efforts of Fernando de Valdés and other officials such as Alonso de las Alas, Bartolomé de Argüelles, Juan Menéndez Marques and the friars who accompanied the expedition (who believed that the Indians of Florida provided bountiful opportunities for conversion to Christianity) proved to be successful in averting the abandonment of Florida.

The Osorio Devastations signified the beginning of the strengthening of the Hispanic military presence in Hispaniola, since, to put the order into practice, the support of 159 soldiers from the garrison of San Juan was requested from Puerto Rico. The terrible economic impact of the royal order eventually caused a change in the financing of Hispaniola, transferring it from the viceroyalty of New Spain to that of viceroyalty of Peru. However, from the 1680s onwards, the growing threat of buccaneers as well as that of French forces meant that Hispaniola and Cuba became major recipients of economic resources from New Spain, primarily for military purposes. 

Historians conclude that the Devastations of Osorio constituted an error that brought no benefits to the colonists nor to the Spanish Crown. Instead, it left the economy of the island in a state of crisis and stagnation that lasted several decades. In addition, it presented an opportunity for foreigners and enemies of Spain to settle the abandoned territory, who later formed the French colony of Saint Domingue. From the 18th century, thanks to its productive sugar and coffee plantations, it became one of the strongest economies of the Caribbean and the principal colony of France.

In fiction
 The Devastations form the backdrop of Antonio Benitez-Rojo's short story "Windward Passage" in the collection A View from the Mangrove
 The Spanish-Dominican writer Carlos Esteban Deive published a novel in 1979, Las devastaciones, which won the Premio Siboney 
 Juan José Ponce Vázquez, a Spanish historian at the University of Alabama in Tuscaloosa has published a monograph dealing with this period, titled Islanders and Empire: Smuggling and Political Defiance in Hispaniola, 1580–1690 (2020).

References

Forcibly depopulated communities
History of Hispaniola 
History of the Dominican Republic
History of the Colony of Santo Domingo
16th century in the Dominican Republic
History of Haiti